Howard Yuan-Hao Chang (born 1972) is a Taiwan-born American physician-scientist. He is the Virginia and D. K. Ludwig Professor of Cancer Genomics and of Genetics at Stanford University and a Howard Hughes Medical Institute Investigator.

Chang was born in Taipei, Taiwan. He studied biochemistry at Harvard University and completed a doctorate in biology at the Massachusetts Institute of Technology and medical degree at Harvard Medical School as part of the Harvard-MIT physician scientist training program. He was awarded the 2018 NAS Award in Molecular Biology for "discoveries of long noncoding RNAs and technologies unveiling the noncoding genome."

He was elected fellow of the American Academy of Arts and Science in 2020.

References

1972 births
Living people
Scientists from Taipei
21st-century American physicians
Taiwanese emigrants to the United States
Harvard Medical School alumni
Massachusetts Institute of Technology School of Science alumni
Stanford University faculty
Fellows of the American Academy of Arts and Sciences
Members of the National Academy of Medicine